Nakur  Assembly constituency is one  of the 403 constituencies of the Uttar Pradesh Legislative Assembly,  India. It is a part of the Saharanpur district  and one of the five assembly constituencies in the Kairana Lok Sabha constituency. First election in this assembly constituency was held in 1952 after the "DPACO (1951)" (delimitation order) was passed in 1951. After the "Delimitation of Parliamentary and Assembly Constituencies Order" was passed in 2008, the constituency was assigned identification number 2.

Wards and areas
Extent  of Nakur Assembly constituency is KCs Nakur, Sarsawa, Sultanpur, Sarsawa NPP,  Nakur NPP and Chilkana Sultanpur NP of Nakur-Tehsil.

Members of the Legislative Assembly

Election results

2022

2017

2012

2007

See also

Kairana Lok Sabha constituency
Saharanpur district
Sixteenth Legislative Assembly of Uttar Pradesh
Uttar Pradesh Legislative Assembly
Vidhan Bhawan

References

External links
 

Assembly constituencies of Uttar Pradesh
Politics of Saharanpur district